Rhyzodiastes polinosus is a species of ground beetle in the subfamily Rhysodinae. It was described by R.T. & J.R. Bell in 1981. It is found in the Caroline Islands (Palau and the Federated States of Micronesia). Rhyzodiastes polinosus measure  in length.

References

Rhyzodiastes
Beetles of Oceania
Fauna of the Federated States of Micronesia
Fauna of Palau
Beetles described in 1981